Sequal may refer to:
SEQUAL framework, systems modelling reference model for evaluating the quality of models
Sequal (group), American Latin freestyle female duo
Sequal (album), the group's only album, 1988

Sequal is also a common misspelling for sequel.

See also
Sequel (disambiguation)
Sequals